Bad News may refer to:

Music

Albums
 Bad News (Bad News album) or the title song, 1987
 Bad News (Ligeia album) or the title song, 2008
 Bad News, by Butterfingers, 2020
 Bad News Live, by Moon Martin, 1993

Songs
 "Bad News" (John D. Loudermilk song), 1963; covered by Johnny Cash (1964)
 "Bad News", by Bastille, the B-side of the single "Oblivion", 2014
 "Bad News", by Camouflage from Spice Crackers, 1995
 "Bad News", by Ella Henderson from Everything I Didn't Say, 2022
 "Bad News", by Kanye West from 808s & Heartbreak, 2008
 "Bad News", by Kehlani from It Was Good Until It Wasn't, 2020
 "Bad News", by the Kid Laroi from F*ck Love, 2021
 "Bad News", by Status Quo from In Search of the Fourth Chord, 2007
 "Bad News", by The Trashmen, 1964

Performers
 Bad News (band), an English spoof rock band
 Bad News Brown (musician) (1943-2007), Canadian musician, actor and harmonica player of Haitian origin

Film and television
 "Bad News" (How I Met Your Mother), a television episode of How I Met Your Mother
 "Bad News" (Patrick Melrose episode), of the television series based on the novels by Edward St Aubyn

Other uses
 Bad News, a 1992 novel in the Patrick Melrose series by Edward St Aubyn
 Bad News, a 1980s comics magazine co-edited by Paul Karasik
 Bad News Brown or Bad News Allen or Buffalo Allen (1943-2007), real name Allen Coage, American and Canadian sportsman and judoka. He used various ring names including Bad News Brown in his period as a free wrestling champion

See also
 Good news (disambiguation)